North Hwanghae Provincial College of Physical Education  (Chosŏn'gŭl: 황해북도체육전문학교) is a North Korean football club.

External links
North Korea 2007 FIFA U-20 World Cup squad

Football clubs in North Korea
University and college association football clubs